James McLachlan (1870 – unknown) was a Scottish footballer who played in the Football League for Derby County and Notts County.

References

1870 births
Date of death unknown
Scottish footballers
English Football League players
Derby County F.C. players
Notts County F.C. players
Vale of Leven F.C. players
Association football wingers
Footballers from Glasgow